Hans Lennart Olofsson Strandberg (26 March 1915 – 23 December 1989) was a Swedish sprinter. He specialized in the 100 metres event, in which he won a bronze medal at the 1938 European Championships and finished sixth at the 1936 Summer Olympics. In 1938, he also won a silver medal with the Swedish 4 × 100 m relay team.

Strandberg held Swedish titles in the 100 m (1934–38, 1940–43, 1945 and 1947), 200 m (1934–45), 4 × 100 m (1934–38, 1942–44, 1946–47 and 1950–52) and 4 × 400 m events (1935, 1937 and 1939). His 1936 Swedish record in the 100 m equaled the world record. His son Bobby was a national sprint coach in the 1960s.

References

1915 births
1989 deaths
Swedish male sprinters
Athletes (track and field) at the 1936 Summer Olympics
European Athletics Championships medalists
Sportspeople from Malmö
20th-century Swedish people